The Nicaraguan Civil Aeronautics Institute (INAC, from Spanish: Instituto Nicaragüense de Aeronáutica Civil) is the civil aviation authority of Nicaragua. Its headquarters are in Managua.

The Comisión Investigadora de Accidentes de Aviación of the INAC investigates aviation accidents and incidents.

References

External links

 Instituto Nicaragüense de Aeronáutica Civil 

Aviation organizations based in Nicaragua
Government of Nicaragua
Nicaragua
Organizations investigating aviation accidents and incidents